McNeile Glacier is a glacier flowing northward along the east slopes of Klokotnitsa Ridge to the southeast side of Almond Point where it enters Charcot Bay just east of Borovan Knoll, on the west side of Graham Land, Antarctica. It was charted in 1948 by the Falkland Islands Dependencies Survey (FIDS) and named for S.St.C. McNeile, a surveyor at the FIDS Hope Bay base in 1948–49.

References

Glaciers of Graham Land
Davis Coast